Reflex Fiberglass Works was an American aircraft and boat manufacturer based in Walterboro, South Carolina and founded in 1996. The company specialized in the design and manufacture of fiberglass structures including kit aircraft.

The company was out of business by the mid-2000s.

Aircraft

References

Defunct aircraft manufacturers of the United States
American boat builders
Homebuilt aircraft